Tecmessa is a New World genus of moths of the family Notodontidae described by Hermann Burmeister in 1878, and historically confused with the Old World genus Cerura.

Species
In alphabetical order:
Tecmessa annulifera (Berg, 1878)
Tecmessa argentina (Dognin, 1911)
Tecmessa argynnis (Schaus, 1901)
Tecmessa bratteata (Draudt, 1932)
Tecmessa candida (Lintner, 1878)
Tecmessa dandon (Druce, 1894)
Tecmessa duonumenia (Dyar, 1912)
Tecmessa gonema (Schaus, 1905)
Tecmessa lancea (Schaus, 1905)
Tecmessa laqueata (Schaus, 1911)
Tecmessa olindata (Schaus, 1939)
Tecmessa presidio (Dyar, 1922)
Tecmessa purusa (Schaus, 1928)
Tecmessa rarata (Walker, 1865)
Tecmessa rivers (Schaus, 1901)
Tecmessa scitiscripta (Walker, 1865)
Tecmessa splendens (Jones, 1908)
Tecmessa tehuacana (Draudt, 1932)
Tecmessa trigonostigma (Dyar, 1925)
Tecmessa xicona (Dyar, 1924)

References

Notodontidae
Moth genera